The Women's 470 was a sailing event on the Sailing at the 2016 Summer Olympics program in Rio de Janeiro, in the 470 dinghy. It took place between 10 and 17 August at Marina da Glória. 11 races (the last one a medal race) were held.

The medals were presented by Barry Maister, IOC member, New Zealand and Sarah Webb Gosling, Vice President of World Sailing.

Schedule

Results

References 

Women's 470
470 competitions
Women's events at the 2016 Summer Olympics
Olym